Il prato macchiato di rosso is a 1973 Italian film directed by Riccardo Ghione.

Plot
Emilia-Romagna, Italy, early seventies. A Unesco agent discovers that blood is contained in a bottle of wine produced by a well-known Italian winery. A couple of hippies in their wanderings come across Antonio who accompanies them to the villa where he lives with his sister and brother-in-law. In the sumptuous house the two young men meet strange characters: a gypsy woman, a prostitute and a disquieting drunkard. The landlord, Michelino Croci, reassures them by saying that he is only a wine producer and loves to host strange people. In reality, Mr. Antonio is a madman who created a mechanism, a sort of robot capable of sucking blood from human bodies.

Cast

Style
Italian film critic and historian Roberto Curti described the film as mixing elements from the gothic genre, the thriller and a little bit of science fiction.

Production
Shortly after the release of director Riccardo Ghione's previous film A cuore freddo, Ghione was working on his next film titled Vampiro 2000 which was shot in the village of Fiorenzuola d'Arda. Ghione announced a different film during this period, an adaptation of Il male oscuro, the autobiography by Giuseppe Berto, which never came to fruition. Vampiro 2000 eventually became retitled as Il pratto macchiato di rosso.

Release
Il pratto macchiato di rosso was distributed theatrically in Italy by Drago Film and had its premiere on 2 March 1973 in Fiorenzuola d'Arda. The film grossed a total of 56,364,000 Italian lire domestically on its initial release. According to Curti, after the film's release it vanished into obscurity to only be brought back to attention on a home video release around 2017.

Reception
Curti declared that Il prato macchiato di rosso retained a small level of notoriety in the village of Fiorenzuola where the memory of the shooting of the film remained vivid still in 2018.

See also
 List of Italian films of 1973

Footnotes

References

External links

Il prato macchiato di rosso at Variety Distribution

1973 films
Italian thriller films
1970s Italian films